Ghanam Al-Jumhur (1931 – 8 March 2022) was a Kuwaiti politician. An independent, he served in the National Assembly from 1963 to 1999. He died in Kuwait City on 8 March 2022.

References

1931 births
2022 deaths
Members of the National Assembly (Kuwait)
People from Kuwait City